Pleuronichthys japonicus is a species of flatfish in the family Pleuronectidae.

References

japonicus
Fish of Japan
Taxa named by Tetsuji Nakabo
Fish described in 2009